This is a listing of American television network programs currently airing or have aired during daytime.

Current 
Daytime talk programming begins at 1:00pm or earlier Eastern Time Zone/Pacific Time Zone, after network affiliates' late local news.

Former

Broadcast networks

ABC 

 The Chew (September 26, 2011 – June 28, 2018)
 The Revolution (January 16–July 6, 2012)

NBC 

 Megyn Kelly Today (September 25, 2017 – October 24, 2018)

Syndication 

 The Dr. Oz Show (September 14, 2009 – January 14, 2022)
 The Doctors (September 8, 2008 – August 8, 2022)
 The Ellen DeGeneres Show (September 8, 2003 – May 26, 2022)
 The Wendy Williams Show (July 14, 2008-June 17, 2022)
 The Jerry Springer Show (September 30, 1991 – July 26, 2018)
 Maury (September 9, 1991 – September 8, 2022)
 The Tyra Banks Show (September 12, 2005 – May 28, 2010)

References

Daytime talk
American television talk shows